Ian Page may refer to:

 Ian Page (singer) (born 1960), British singer and author
 Ian Page (conductor) (born 1963), British conductor